Zizula, commonly called grass blues, is a genus of butterflies in the family Lycaenidae.

Species
There are two species:
 Zizula cyna (Edwards, 1881) – tiny blue, cyna blue
= Lycaena tulliola Godman & Salvin, 1887
= Lycaena mela Strecker, 1900
 Zizula hylax (Fabricius, 1775) – little grass blue
=Zizula gaika, originally Lycaena gaika (Trimen, 1862) – South Africa
=Lycaena mylica Guenée, 1863 - Réunion
=Lycaena cleodora Walker, 1870 - Egypt
=Lycaena perparva Saalmüller, 1884 - Madagascar

Subspecies
 Zizula hylax attenuata (Lucas, 1890) - Australia
 Zizula hylax dampierensis (Rothschild, 1915) - Dampier Is.
 Zizula hylax hylax (Fabricius, 1775) - India, Tranquebar
 Zizula hylax pygmea (Snellen, 1876) - Java – pygmy grass blue

Notes
 In 1967, ICZN published a ruling on the type species of Pithecops Horsfield, [1818] in favour of a proposal by Cowan, 1965. This effectively recognised the syntype of Papilio hylax Fabr. found in Copenhagen, and validated Zizula hylax as the correct name for the taxon also known as Lycaena gaika Trimen. Savela, in Funet, and Williams in Afrotropical butterflies, as well as earlier south-east Asian references use Fabricius' name hylax as the designation of the taxon. Zizula gaika is reduced to a synonym of hylax by Cowan's proposal and the CZN opinion. Horsfield's use [1928] of the combination Pithecops hylax is shown by Cowan to be a misidentification.
 Lepindex includes a card for Zizula escalantiana Descimon et al., 1973, which appears erroneous. The taxon escalantiana was described in 1973 by Stoffel & Mast, and is a Nymphalid butterfly in the tribe Preponini. See Lamas, 2004. The Lepindex card includes confirmatory information that escalantiana was described in Prepona Boisduval, 1836, and originates from Mexico. According to Lamas, escalantiana is a subjective synonym of Prepona deiphile (Godart, [1824]).

References

Polyommatini
Lycaenidae genera